Current Psychiatry Reports is a bimonthly peer-reviewed medical journal publishing review articles related to psychiatry. It was established in 1999 and is published by Springer Science+Business Media. The editors-in-chief are Robert O. Friedel (Medical College of Virginia) and Dwight L. Evans (University of Pennsylvania). According to the Journal Citation Reports, the journal has a 2021 impact factor of 8.081.

References

External links

Publications established in 1999
Psychiatry journals
Springer Science+Business Media academic journals
Bimonthly journals
Review journals
English-language journals